Tall-i Bakun or Tall-e Bakun (in modern Fars Province, Iran) was a prehistoric site in the Ancient Near East about 3 kilometers south of Persepolis in the Kor River basin. It was inhabited around 5400-4000 BC.

Archaeology
The site consists of two mounds, A (about 2 hectares in area) and B. In 1928, exploratory excavation was done by Ernst Herzfeld, of the University of Berlin. Alexander Langsdorff and Donald McCown conducted full scale excavations in 1932. Additional work was done at the site in 1937 by Erich Schmidt leading the Persepolis Expedition of the Oriental Institute of the University of Chicago.
 Some limited work, a single trench, was done at Tall-i Bakun by a team from the Tokyo University led by Namio Egami and Seiichi Masuda in 1956.
The most recent excavations, 3 small trenches, were by a joint team of the Oriental Institute and the Iranian Cultural Heritage and Tourism Organization in 2004.

History

The site was active from circa 6th millennium BC to circa 4th millennium BC.

Tall-i Bakun phase A was inhabited c. 4000-3500 BCE. Four layers can be distinguished. Layer III was the best preserved and shows a settlement in which the residential buildings were built close together with no roads or paths. Individual houses consisted of several rooms. Remains of mural paintings and of wooden columns suggest a once rich interior. Richly painted pottery was produced. There were also ceramic female figurines and those of animals. Artifactual remains from the site include objects made of copper, pottery and stone.

Around 140 fired clay sealings were found in various buildings, the majority being from use as door seals. They were created using stamp seals.

The wealth and variety of material items at Bakun and the evidence of large workshop areas point to the existence of local industry and connection/trade with distant regions such as the Persian Gulf, the central plateau, Kerman, and northeastern Iran whence goods like shells, copper, steatite, lapis, and turquoise were procured. If my inferences are correct, we have a settlement that is spatially arranged according to its functional needs and socio-economic organization.

Three other nearby Bakun period sites Tappeh Rahmatabad, Tol-e Nurabad, and Tol-e Pir were three times larger than Tall-i Bakun 'A'.

Kiln technology
Tall-i Bakun 'A' is the only site in the area providing a long sequence of ancient kilns. These double-chamber kilns have been in use for at least 300 years with no significant changes. 

A number of other kilns in the Near East share some elements of the Bakun kilns. There are close parallels with those of Tepe Gawra of the same time period. Also there are parallels with those from the Sinai Peninsula of the Egyptian New Kingdom period. Similar designs are not found elsewhere in the Levant.

Bakun culture
The Bakun culture flourished in the Fars Province of Iran in the fifth and early fourth millenniums BC. It had a long duration and wide geographical distribution. Its pottery tradition was as sophisticated as that of Susa I. Nevertheless, it was mostly a nomadic culture, and its settlements were typically much smaller than those of Susa.

Bakun pottery (Bakun-ware) is known in the Fars region in the form of bowls and jugs with green, reddish brown or deep brown bands and stripes.

Outside Fars this pottery has been found in northern Khuzestan, in the Bakhtiari mountains, and in the Behbahan and Zuhreh regions.

In the late fifth and early fourth millennia BC, Bakun A settlements were at once manufacturing sites and centres for the administration of production and trade. Their painted pottery featured some unusual specific motifs, such as large-horned mountain
sheep and goats, that were rare or unique elsewhere.

After the decline of Bakun, Lapui period followed. In recent publications, Bakun period is dated 4800-4100 BC, and the Lapui period is dated to 4100-3500 BC.

Gallery
Examples of pottery from Tall-e Bukan

See also
lakh Mazar
List of Iranian artifacts abroad

Rahmatabad Mound
 Cities of the ancient Near East

Notes

Further reading
 Alexander Langsdorff and Donald McCown, Socio-Economic Complexity in Southwestern Iran During the Fifth and Fourth Millennia BC: The Evidence from Tall-e Bakun A, Journal of the British Institute of Persian Studies, IRAN, vol. 26, pp. 17–34, 1988

External links

 Ernst Herzfeld Papers, Series 5: Drawings and Maps, Records of Tall-e Bakun Collections Search Center, S.I.R.I.S., Smithsonian Institution, Washington, D.C.
 Finding Aids Freer Gallery of Art and Arthur M. Sackler Gallery Archives, Smithsonian Institution, Washington, D.C.
Site photograph from the Oriental Institute
Bowl from Tall-i Bakun at the British Museum

Archaeological sites in Iran
Buildings and structures in Fars Province
National works of Iran